Grevillea pilulifera, commonly known as woolly-flowered grevillea, is a species of flowering plant in the family Proteaceae and is endemic to the south-west of Western Australia. It is an erect or spreading shrub with linear to narrowly oblong leaves and hairy, white to cream-coloured flowers, the style with a bright yellow, later red tip.

Description
The end of the style is glabrous, bright yellow at first, turning orange, then red as the flower ages.

Taxonomy
This species was first formally described in 1840 by John Lindley, who gave it the name Hakea pilulifera in A Sketch of the Vegetation of the Swan River Colony. In 1917, George Claridge Druce changed the name to Grevillea pilulifera in The Botanical Exchange Club and Society of the British Isles Report for 1916. The specific epithet (pilulifera) means "bearing a little ball", referring to the tight clusters of buds.

Distribution and habitat
Woolly-flowered grevillea is found among medium to low sized trees in scrubland or heathland on gravelly soil. It is widespread between Badgingarra, Busselton and Albany and is commonly found on the Darling Range.

See also
 List of Grevillea species

References

pilulifera
Proteales of Australia
Eudicots of Western Australia
Taxa named by John Lindley
Plants described in 1840